"Connected for Life" is the second single released off Mack 10's fifth studio album, Bang or Ball. The song is produced by Mannie Fresh. The song peaked on the Hot R&B/Hip-Hop Songs at 57.

Track listing
CD single
"Connected for Life (Album Version)" - 4:24
"Connected for Life (Main/Clean Version)" - 4:23
"Connected for Life (Instrumental)" - 4:25
"Connected for Life (Acappella)" - 3:43

Chart performance

References

2001 songs
2002 singles
Mack 10 songs
Ice Cube songs
Cash Money Records singles
Song recordings produced by Mannie Fresh
Songs written by Ice Cube
Songs written by Mannie Fresh
Songs written by Mack 10
Songs written by WC (rapper)
G-funk songs